Baker Bhai ( lit. "Brother Bāker") is the lead character in a popular Bangladeshi television series called Kothao Keu Nei. The character is portrayed by Bangladeshi actor Asaduzzaman Noor. The show was created by Humayun Ahmed in 1990.

Character

Baker (Asaduzzaman Noor) is portrayed as a local gangster who patrols the streets with his two companions, Bodi (Abdul Kader) and Mojnu (Lutfur Rahman George). As the leader of this small motorcycle gang, Bakeer Bhai skirts the edges of society, living just outside the law and outside of mainstream society. Although a rogue, gangster and rebellious spirit, he is known as a fair and just individual who won't hesitate to step in and correct an injustice or to come to the aid of the defenseless.

During the course of the drama, Baker Bhai endears himself to a woman named Muna (Suborna Mustafa), who initially disrespects him as a common thug, but eventually succumbs to his roguish charms and his sense of justice and develops feelings for him. As the head of a gang, Baker Bhai has to juggle the many competing claims to his turf. This and his readiness to come to the defense of the victimized get him in a series of serious conflicts and dangerous situations. In the end, he is betrayed by one of his own friends and is hanged on a charge of murder despite being innocent. Baker Bhai forgave his betrayer before his execution.

Reception
The series was so popular in Bangladesh, and the character of Baker Bhai so beloved, that mass street protests took place when it was learned that the character would be sentenced to be hanged. Protesters gathered in the thousands and threatened to retaliate if the television station, Bangladesh Television, didn't reverse this decision. The station, however, didn't change their plans and the series ended with beloved Baker Bhai's death.

Filmography
 Kothao Keu Nei

See also
 Kothao Keu Nei, a Bangladeshi television series based on the novel with the same name, written by Humayun Ahmed. Directed by Mohammad Barkatullah.
 Misir Ali, Bengali character created by Humayun Ahmed.
 Himu,  Bengali character created by Humayun Ahmed.
 Shuvro,  Bengali character created by Humayun Ahmed.
 Tuni,  Bengali character created by Humayun Ahmed.

References

Characters created by Humayun Ahmed
Television characters introduced in 1990
Fictional gangsters
Fictional Bengali people
Fictional Bangladeshi people
Male characters in literature